Petronella Dunois (1650–1695) was a Dutch art collector, known for her dollhouse in the Rijksmuseum in Amsterdam.

Life 
Dunois lived with her sister Maria in Amsterdam after her parents died. Both sisters were rich and commissioned their own dollhouse, but only Petronella's has been preserved through the centuries. It is mentioned first in her dowry list in 1677. In that year, Dunois married the Leiden regent Pieter van Groenendijck. Besides the dollhouse, her list contained other costly items such as linens and stock options. In 1680 the couple's portraits were painted by the leading Hague portrait painter Nicolaes Maes.  
The dollhouse was preserved in the family, descending via the female line until the dollhouse was donated to the museum in 1934. In 1994 the museum was able to purchase the pendant wedding portraits of the former owners.

Gallery

Provenance
According to the woman who donated the dollhouse in 1934, it was originally in the collection of the admiral Michiel de Ruyter. The Amsterdam historian Isabella van Eeghen tried to prove this in her 1953 article about the dollhouse, but this was later disproved by Fock, though the donor was indeed a descendant of De Ruyter.

References

 BK-14656 object record for the dollhouse in the Rijksmuseum
Jet Pijzel-Dommisse : De 17de-eeuwse Poppenhuizen in het Rijksmuseum, 1994, Inmere BV Wormer i.s.m. Rijksmuseum-Stichting Amsterdam 
 Jet Pijzel-Dommisse : Het Hollandse pronkpoppenhuis, 2000, Rijksmuseum, Amsterdam en Waanders Uitgevers 

1650 births
1695 deaths
Art collectors from Amsterdam
Women collectors
Art collectors from The Hague